= Martin Scorsese bibliography =

A list of books and essays about Martin Scorsese:

- Conard, Mark (31 May 2007). The Philosophy of Martin Scorsese. University Press of Kentucky. ISBN 0-8131-7255-1.
- Keyser, Lester J. (1992). Martin Scorsese. Twayne. ISBN 978-0-8057-9315-4.
- LoBrutto, Vincent (2008). Martin Scorsese: A Biography. Greenwood Publishing Group. ISBN 978-0-275-98705-3.
- Scorsese, Martin (1996). Scorsese on Scorsese: The Update. Faber & Faber, Incorporated. ISBN 978-0-571-17827-8.
- Scorsese, Martin; Brunette, Peter (1 January 1999). Martin Scorsese: Interviews. Univ. Press of Mississippi. ISBN 978-1-57806-072-6.
